The Colony is a 1996 TV film directed by Tim Hunter.

Plot 
A man moves his family into a suburbia that at first seems fantastic, but soon turns into a nightmare.

Cast

Reception 
Hal Erickson of Rovi wrote "Set in a high-price Malibu community, this made-for-TV drama wallows in a multitude of extramarital affairs, corporate intrigue and elegant back-stabbing, with murder the logical extension to all the hanky-panky. Characters crucial to the plotline are a cop posing as an auto mechanic, and a sexy nanny who intends to break up her best friend's marriage. The ending is abrupt and unsatisfying, a sure sign that the film was actually the pilot for an unsold series. Written and produced by Dynasty veterans Richard Shapiro and Esther Shapiro, The Colony was originally consigned to a 'dog day'"

References

External links 
 

American television films
English-language Canadian films
1996 television films
Films directed by Tim Hunter
1996 thriller films
1996 films
Canadian thriller television films
1990s Canadian films